List of musical intervals may refer to:

 Interval (music)#Main intervals as abstract relations between notes in western music theory.
 List of pitch intervals as frequency ratios in intonation and tuning of musical instruments and performances.